Marcio Camillato Martinelli (born 8 June 1998), commonly known as Marcinho, is a Brazilian footballer who currently plays as a forward for Desportiva Ferroviária.

Career statistics

Club

Notes

References

1998 births
Living people
Brazilian footballers
Association football forwards
Espírito Santo Futebol Clube players
Grêmio Foot-Ball Porto Alegrense players
Vitória Futebol Clube (ES) players
Desportiva Ferroviária players
Retrô Futebol Clube Brasil players